Rob Saxton is an educational administrator and the current Interim Superintendent of Greater Albany Public Schools in Albany, Oregon. He previously served from 2012 to 2015 as Oregon's first executive "Deputy Superintendent of Public Instruction," the chief administrator of the Oregon Department of Education.

Career

Early career 

Saxton started his career in education as a teacher and football coach in Big Spring, Texas. He returned to his home state after accepting a job teaching in Albany, Oregon. Rob's first administrative position was at West Albany High.  He later held school administrative posts in nearby districts of McMinnville, Oregon and Sherwood, Oregon.  Following this, he was hired as Superintendent of Tigard-Tualatin School District.  He served as superintendent in Tigard-Tualatin for seven years.

Deputy Superintendent of Public Instruction 

From 1872 to 2012, the Oregon Department of Education was led by an elected constitutional officer titled the Oregon Superintendent of Public Instruction. However, in 2012, the Oregon legislature eliminated the office of Superintendent of Public Instruction and consolidated its functions with the office of governor. Under the new system, the Governor John Kitzhaber appointed Saxton as the first ever "Deputy Superintendent," a new position in charge of the day-to-day operation of the Oregon Department of Education. The Deputy Superintendent of Public Instruction is a professional position, as opposed to an elected position. 

Saxton left the Deputy Superintendent position in 2015 to become Superintendent of Northwest Regional Education Service District.

References 

Living people
Schoolteachers from Texas
School superintendents in Oregon
Year of birth missing (living people)
Place of birth missing (living people)
Education in Oregon